Mackenzie King Island is one of the uninhabited Queen Elizabeth Islands in northern Canada. It lies north of Melville Island and south of Borden Island, and like them is divided when it comes to administration. Most of the island is in Northwest Territories, while its easternmost portion lies in Nunavut. The border runs along the 110th meridian west.

History 
The first known visit to the island was by Vilhjalmur Stefansson in 1915, and it was later named for William Lyon Mackenzie King.

References

Further reading

 Vilks, G. Foraminiferal Study of East Bay, Mackenzie King Island, District of Franklin (Polar Continental Shelf Project). [Ottawa]: Dept. of Mines and Technical Surveys, 1964.

External links
 Mackenzie King Island in the Atlas of Canada - Toporama; Natural Resources Canada

Islands of the Queen Elizabeth Islands
Uninhabited islands of Qikiqtaaluk Region
Uninhabited islands of the Northwest Territories
Borders of Nunavut
Borders of the Northwest Territories